Rembercourt-sur-Mad (literally Rembercourt on Mad) is a commune in the Meurthe-et-Moselle department in Grand Est in northeastern France.

Geography
The Rupt de Mad flows northeastward through the commune and crosses the village.

See also
Communes of the Meurthe-et-Moselle department
Parc naturel régional de Lorraine

References

Rembercourtsurmad